The pinza bolognese (pénza in Bolognese) is a dessert that comes from the Bolognese peasant tradition, which was generally prepared during the Christmas holidays, even if it is now consumed all year round. It's recipe appears for the first time in 1644 in the volume L'economia del cittadino in villa by Vincenzo Tanara.

The name most likely derives from its shape, as it looks like a roll of hard dough that holds the bolognese mustard inside it.

References 

Italian cuisine
Italian desserts